Dženan Đonlagić (born 31 May  1974) is a Bosnian economist. He is ex-prorector of the University of Sarajevo and the chief economic expert of Democratic Front, a social democratic political party in Bosnia and Herzegovina.

Education 

Đonlagić graduated from the Faculty of Economics at the International Islamic University Malaysia in 1997 and obtained a PhD at the University of Sarajevo in 2006 in the field of monetary and fiscal policy.

Academic career 

Đonlagić began teaching at the University of Sarajevo in 1998 as a teaching assistant. He became a professor of Finances in 2006. He has also served as the vice-dean and executive manager of School of Economics and Business Sarajevo from 2008 until 2011. In 2012 he became a prorector of the University of Sarajevo.
He is an author of three books and of more than a dozen of papers in the fields of monetary policy, fiscal policy and central banking. He also frequently appears as an economic commentator at Al Jazeera Balkans.

Political career 

In 2013, Đonlagić became the head of Council for Economic Rights of the Democratic Front, a newly formed social democratic party in Bosnia and Herzegovina. He is in charge of a team of experts responsible for drafting the party's economic and fiscal policy.

References 

1974 births
Living people
People from Doboj
Bosnia and Herzegovina economists
University of Sarajevo alumni
International Islamic University Malaysia alumni
Academic staff of the University of Sarajevo
Bosnia and Herzegovina politicians
Democratic Front (Bosnia and Herzegovina) politicians
Bosniaks of Bosnia and Herzegovina